The 1946 Geneva Covenanters football team was an American football team that represented Geneva College as an independent during the 1946 college football season. In their second, non-consecutive season under head coach Alured Ransom, the Covenanters compiled a 7–1 record and outscored opponents by a total of 142 to 35.

The team played it home games at Reeves Field in Beaver Falls, Pennsylvania.

Schedule

References

Geneva
Geneva Golden Tornadoes football seasons
Geneva Covenanters football